Schleuse is a river of Thuringia, Germany. It is a tributary of the Werra, which it joins in Kloster Veßra. The town Schleusingen lies on the Schleuse.

See also
List of rivers of Thuringia

Rivers of Thuringia
Rivers of Germany